Claude Point is a headland which forms the south side of the entrance to Guyou Bay on the west side of Brabant Island, in the Palmer Archipelago. It was discovered by the French Antarctic Expedition, 1903–05, under Jean-Baptiste Charcot, who named it for Monsieur Claude, an associate member of the Bureau des Longitudes.

Maps 
 Antarctic Digital Database (ADD). Scale 1:250000 topographic map of Antarctica. Scientific Committee on Antarctic Research (SCAR). Since 1993, regularly upgraded and updated.
British Antarctic Territory. Scale 1:200000 topographic map. DOS 610 Series, Sheet W 64 62. Directorate of Overseas Surveys, Tolworth, UK, 1980.
Brabant Island to Argentine Islands. Scale 1:250000 topographic map. British Antarctic Survey, 2008.

Further reading 
 Defense Mapping Agency  1992, Sailing Directions (planning Guide) and (enroute) for Antarctica, P 341

External links 

 Claude Point on USGS website
 Claude Point on SCAR website

References 
 

Headlands of the Palmer Archipelago
Brabant Island